Paddy Gogarty is a former Gaelic football corner forward for the Dublin county team. He played his club football for Raheny. Paddy won an All-Ireland Senior Football Championship medal with Dublin in 1976. He won a National Football League medal with Dublin in during the same year.

External links 
Official Dublin Website
Hoganstand.com

Year of birth missing (living people)
Living people
Dublin inter-county Gaelic footballers
Raheny GAA footballers